Nestle v National Westminster Bank plc [1992] EWCA Civ 12 is an English trusts law case concerning the duty of care when a trustee is making an investment.

Facts
A testator died in 1922 and named his widow, two sons and wives and one grandchild as the beneficiaries. The wife got the family home as a life interest and a tax free annuity. The two sons got annuities between age 21 and 25 and life interests in half the trust with a power to appoint income to their wives and Georgina, the grandchild, got the remainder. In 1922 there was £53,963 and in 1986 when Georgina became entitled, there was £269,203. She claimed that had the fund been invested properly it would have been worth well over £1m. The trust company had failed to conduct periodic reviews of investments. They invested in tax-exempt gilts because the sons were domiciled abroad, meaning exemption from inheritance tax.

Judgment

High Court
Hoffmann J (as he then was) held that there was no breach of the duty of care. He said the following.

Court of Appeal
Staughton LJ held there was no breach of trust. Despite this the trust company fell ‘woefully short of maintaining the real value of the fund, let alone matching the average increase in price of ordinary shares’. The company had not acted ‘conscientiously, fairly and carefully’ and there was ‘not much for the bank to be proud of in its administration of the… trust’.

He emphasised that ‘trustees’ performance must not be judged with hindsight: 'after the event even a fool is wise, as a poet said nearly 3,000 years ago…' and accepted evidence that equities were regarded as risky before 1959. ‘It was only in 1959 that [they became more popular].’

Dillon LJ and Leggatt LJ concurred.

See also

English trusts law
English contract law

Notes

References
C Webb and T Akkouh, Trusts law (Palgrave 2008) 315 suggest Wednesbury unreasonableness is needed, because in Nestle failing to follow a ‘course which no prudent trustee would have followed’ was said to be the standard. It seems clear that the standard is now that in TA 2000 s 1.
Crawford, ‘A Fiduciary Duty to Use Derivatives’ (1995) 1 Stan JL Bus & Finance 307

English trusts case law
Court of Appeal (England and Wales) cases
1992 in case law
1992 in British law
NatWest Group litigation